Bokonon may refer to:
Bokonon, a character in the book Cat's Cradle
Bokonon, a diviner among the Fon people (see also :pt:Bokonon)